The Nathaniel Russell House is an architecturally distinguished, early 19th-century house at 51 Meeting Street in Charleston, South Carolina, United States. Built in 1808 by wealthy merchant and slave trader Nathaniel Russell, it is recognized as one of America's most important neoclassical houses. It was designated a National Historic Landmark in 1973.

History

In 1765, Nathaniel Russell (1738–1820), relocated from Rhode Island to Charleston, where he prospered as a slave merchant. In 1788, at the age of fifty, Russell married Sarah Hopton (1752–1832), the daughter of an affluent Charleston family. As one of Charleston's more prominent citizens, Russell required a residence commensurate with his status. He began construction of his house in 1803, and completed it five years later (at the age of seventy).

Nathaniel and Sarah Russell had two daughters, Alicia Hopton Russell (1788–1840; who married Arthur Middleton) and Sarah Russell (1792–1857; who married Right Rev. Theodore Dehon). Sarah Dehon inherited her father's house and lived there until her death in 1857, after which her children sold it to Robert Allston (1801–1864), a prominent rice planter who lived there while he was governor of South Carolina. In 1870, Allston's executors sold it to the Sisters of Our Lady of Mercy, who used it as a boarding school until 1905, when it was converted back to private use by the Mullally and Pelzer families. In 1953, the owners offered the house for sale and in 1955, having failed to find a buyer, proposed subdividing the property. The Historic Charleston Foundation, formed in 1947, resolved to preserve it intact, raised $65,000, bought the house and grounds, and soon thereafter opened the house to the public.

In 1995, the foundation began a multi-year program of research and reconstruction, to restore the house's architectural details and interior finishes to their 1808 appearance.

Grants and donations have enabled the foundation to acquire a significant collection of objects with a Charleston provenance, allowing it to present visitors with an interpretation of the lifestyle of Charleston's early 19th-century merchant class.

The Nathaniel Russell House was designated a National Historic Landmark in 1960, and added to the National Register of Historic Places in 1973.

House and grounds

Architecture

Russell commissioned an unknown architect to build a large townhouse  in the then fashionable Federal-style. Sited on a large lot in downtown Charleston, the house is rectangular in plan, three stories tall, and faced in gray Carolina brick. A bracketed cornice and paneled balustrade separate the walls from the low hip roof, concealing it from view to better express the pure geometrical shapes of the house.

The more important facades — the entrance facade (facing east) and the garden facade (facing south) are treated formally and arranged symmetrically. The windows of the second, most important story, the “bel etage,” are the tallest; all eleven are capped with marble voussoirs and set into niches with red brick arches. The whole ensemble is connected by a continuous stone string course, creating a kind of architectural necklace running around the east and south sides of the house.

The principal feature of the entrance facade is the single leaf, faux-grained, eight-paneled entrance door, capped by an elliptical fanlite, and flanked by four fluted pilasters. On the floor above, an elegant iron balcony with bowed, elliptical projections bearing the monogram “NR”, spans the full three-bay width of the facade.

The principal feature of the south side is the polygonal bay rising the full height of the house. A second balcony, as light and elegant as the first (but lacking the monograms), wraps around the bay, emphasizing the preeminence of the second story.

An elaborate tripartite window dominates the north facade, seemingly random in location, but carefully placed to sit indoors between landings of the house's elliptical staircase.

Interior

The interior of the Nathaniel Russell house is an exemplar of the neoclassical style (often called Federal style in the United States; late-Georgian or Adam style in Great Britain; and Louis Seize in France), popular during the last two decades of the 18th century and the first two of the 19th. In their interior design, neoclassical architects and craftsmen often created rooms in a variety of geometrical shapes (square, circular, ovoid, elliptical), embellished with elaborate plaster decoration and striking polychrome. The Nathaniel Russell house features three main rooms per floor, each of different geometric designs: a rectangular room in front; a central oval room, and a square room in the rear.

First floor
The rectangular entrance hall with a black and white diamond patterned floorcloth edged with a leaf motif, and the adjacent office was where Russell conducted business. Separating the public rooms at the front of the house from the more private rooms used by the family, wide faux-grained double doors with glazed rosette patterned insets and an elliptical fan shaped transom, gives access to the golden walled stair hall that showcases the most important architectural feature of the house, the cantilevered spiral staircase, that ascends to the third floor. The asymmetrical hall is illuminated by a Palladian window, and further ornamented with trompe-l'œil painting resembling a plaster cornice and an elliptical medallion that were painted by Charleston artisan Samuel O'Hara. Off the central stair hall is the oval dining room, with turquoise walls that appear painted, but are small squares of unpatterned wallpaper bordered with interlocking rings, in red and gold, above cypress wainscoting painted white. The heart-pine floors and the wood interior shutters are original. At the rear of the house is a square parlor, that was enlarged at a later date to connect the house with the kitchen, and was used by the family for everyday dining.

Second floor
The second-floor oval drawing room, to which the women of the house retired after dinner, is the most decorated room in the house. Papered in apricot, its elaborate plaster moldings are embellished with 24-karat gold leaf. Plinth blocks at the base are painted to resemble lapis lazuli. The Adam-style ornamentation of the fireplace mantles are among the most detailed in the city. The curved entry doors are faux-grained to resemble flame-grained mahogany on the exterior and tortoise shell on the interior. Curved mullioned mirrors on one side of the room balance the windows on the other and reflect light into the room.

The large rectangular withdrawing room at the front of the house has soft gray walls and white wainscoting topped by a multilayered gilded cornice. The windows are surrounded by tall slender pilasters and overhanging entablatures that give character to the walls. With windows on three sides, the room was used primarily during the day to take advantage of the daylight and breezes. At the rear of the house is a square shaped master bedroom, and additional bedrooms are found on the third floor. Though most of the art and furniture displayed in the house is not original to the Nathaniel Russell House, they are from the period when the Russell family inhabited the house, and many are of Charleston origin.

Grounds
The house and grounds are separated from the street by a wrought iron fence set atop a low brick wall,  with an iron entrance gate flanked by tall brick piers capped with limestone ball finials. To the south of the house is the garden that was originally laid out in a geometric arrangement with patterned beds of flowers, ornamental shrubs and large orange and grapefruit trees. Today a formal English garden can be found with gravel paths, boxwood hedges and plants favored in the 19th century. In the rear of the house is the two-story slave quarters that housed many of the estimated 18 slaves that were at the Nathaniel Russell House.

Gallery

See also
Charleston Female Seminary
Edmondston-Alston House
List of National Historic Landmarks in South Carolina
National Register of Historic Places listings in Charleston, South Carolina

References

External links

 Nathaniel Russell House, at the Historic Charleston Foundation
Nathaniel Russell House, Charleston County (51 Meeting St., Charleston), at South Carolina Department of Archives and History

Historic Charleston Foundation — Gallery of images of the Nathaniel Russell House
Google maps — Satellite image centered on the building

Houses in Charleston, South Carolina
National Historic Landmarks in South Carolina
Houses on the National Register of Historic Places in South Carolina
Historic American Buildings Survey in South Carolina
Houses completed in 1809
Historic house museums in South Carolina
Museums in Charleston, South Carolina
Biographical museums in South Carolina
National Register of Historic Places in Charleston, South Carolina
Historic district contributing properties in South Carolina
Slave cabins and quarters in the United States